Marshall's Corner, Marshalls Corner, Marshall's Corners or Marshalls Corners can refer to:
 Marshall's Corners, Ontario, Canada
 Marshalls Corner, New Jersey, United States